Let's Talk About It is the first release for Austin, Texas-based indie/blues rockers White Denim. Written and recorded in drummer Joshua Block's vintage 1940s Spartan trailer, the EP was released May 12, 2007. Clocking in at nearly 14 minutes, this five-song 7" record is full of fast-paced, psychedelic-fused blues rock.
Since its release, the EP has received critical acclaim, receiving the title of second-best album of 2007 by ''Gorilla vs. Bear.

Track listing
 "Let's Talk About It" – 3:54
 "Darksided Computer Mouth" – 2:15
 "I Can Tell" – 1:56
 "Mess Your Hair Up" – 4:49
 "DCWYW" – 0:46

Videos
"Let's Talk About It" Music video that was directed by Carlos LaRotta, shot and edited by Trey Cartwright, both of Birds-on-Fire Film

Personnel
James Petralli: Vocals, guitar
Joshua Block: Drums
Steve Terebecki: Vocals, bass

References

External links
Daytrotter Session: Four free songs for download

White Denim albums
2007 EPs